The Young Captives is a 1959 film directed by Irvin Kershner and starring Steven Marlo, Luana Patten, and Tom Selden.

Plot

Cast

External links 
 
 

1959 films
1959 drama films
Paramount Pictures films
Films directed by Irvin Kershner
American drama films
Films scored by Richard Markowitz
1950s English-language films
1950s American films